The Victory Mountains is a major group of mountains in Victoria Land, Antarctica, about  long and  wide, which is bounded primarily by Mariner and Tucker glaciers and the Ross Sea. The division between these mountains and the Concord Mountains (to the NW) is less precise but apparently lies in the vicinity of Thomson Peak.

A Ross Sea aspect of the mountains was first obtained by early British expeditions of Ross, Borchgrevink, Scott and Shackleton. The mapping of the interior mountains was largely done from air photos taken by the U.S. Navy and surveys undertaken by New Zealand and American parties in the 1950s and 1960s. So named by the NZGSAE 1957-58, because of the proximity of this group to the Admiralty Mountains, and with the intention that many of the topographic features would be named for celebrated victories, especially naval victories.

Features

 Aldridge Peak
 Baker Glacier
 Barker Range
 Benighted Pass
 Bertalan Peak
 Borchgrevink Glacier
 Boss Peak
 Bowers Glacier
 Bramble Peak
 Bridwell Peak
 Capling Peak
 Carter Ridge
 Cartographers Range
 Clapp Ridge
 Collins Peak
 Conard Peak
 Coulston Glacier
 Croll Glacier
 Daniell Peninsula
 DeWald Glacier
 Elder Glacier
 Evans Ridge
 Gruendler Glacier
 Hackerman Ridge
 Handler Ridge
 Harrison Peak
 Hearfield Glacier
 Jutland Glacier
 Kyle Peak
 Latino Peak
 Lensen Glacier
 Malta Plateau
 Martin Hill
 McElroy Ridge
 McKellar Glacier
 Midway Glacier
 Millen Range
 Monteath Hills
 Montecchi Glacier
 Mount Bridger
 Mount Burrill
 Mount Burton
 Mount Crowder
 Mount Finch
 Mount Freeman
 Mount Frosch
 Mount Hancox
 Mount Harrington
 Mount Hazlett
 Mount Holdsworth
 Mount Hussey
 Mount Jennings
 Mount Lepanto
 Mount Lopatin
 Mount McDonald
 Mount Northampton
 Mount Pearson
 Mount Randall
 Mount Riddolls
 Mount Tararua
 Nelson Nunatak
 New Year Peak
 Olson Glacier
 O'Neal Ridge
 Osuga Glacier
 Pearl Harbor Glacier
 Piore Ridge
 Plata Glacier
 Potts Glacier
 Purvis Peak
 Saxby Range
 Soft Snow Pass
 Stafford Glacier
 Stevenson Peak
 Stever Ridge
 Summers Glacier
 Thomas Peak
 Trafalgar Glacier
 Trainer Glacier
 Tucker Glacier
 Walker Ridge
 Walsh Spur
 Whiplash Glacier
 Whitehall Glacier
 Wood Glacier

References

Mountain ranges of Victoria Land
Borchgrevink Coast